Morbello (piedmontese: Mirbé) is a comune of the province of Alessandria, in the Italian region, Piedmont. It is located in Upper Montferrat.

Cities and towns in Piedmont